Thomas Owen Staggs (born 1961) is an American business executive and investor. He formerly worked at Disney for nearly 27 years, beginning in 1990, serving as chief operating officer (COO) and chief financial officer (CFO) of The Walt Disney Company and as chairman of Walt Disney Parks and Resorts Worldwide. He holds directorships on various company boards, including Spotify.

Education and early life
Staggs was born in Illinois. He graduated from Minnetonka High School in 1978, and received a B.S. in business from the University of Minnesota and an MBA from the Stanford Graduate School of Business.

Career
Staggs began his career as an investment banker for Dain Bosworth, then Morgan Stanley before joining Disney in 1990.

Disney
After joining Disney in 1990, Staggs rose from his role as a manager of strategic planning to senior vice president of strategic planning and development in 1995. Staggs became executive vice president and chief financial officer in 1998, and became Senior Executive Vice President and CFO in January 2000. As CFO, Staggs was instrumental in purchasing Pixar for $7.4 billion in 2006 as well as acquiring Marvel Entertainment for $4 billion in 2009.

On January 1, 2010, Staggs became Chairman of Walt Disney Parks and Resorts, where he "more than doubled operating profits, to $2.66 billion", while overseeing the company's roughly 140,000 cast members, theme parks, two cruise lines, and hotel and resort businesses. Staggs led the development of the MyMagic plus technology suite. and the creation of an Avatar theme land in Disney's Animal Kingdom park. Disney CEO Bob Iger credited Staggs with leading "unprecedented growth and expansion, including the construction of Shanghai Disney", its $5.5 billion resort.

On February 5, 2015, Staggs was named chief operating officer of The Walt Disney Company. Despite "Disney’s rocky history of succession", Staggs was then widely reported as heir apparent to Bob Iger as the Disney CEO.

On April 4, 2016, Disney announced that Staggs and the company had agreed to mutually part ways. Staggs stepped down as COO, effective May 6, 2016, remaining with the company as a "Special Advisor to the CEO" Bob Iger through the end of the fiscal year. Iger extended his contract as Disney's chairman and CEO to remain chairman through 2021. Following his departure from Disney, and prior to its August 2019 merger with Viacom, Staggs was in consideration to succeed Les Moonves as CEO of CBS.

Forest Road
In October 2020, Staggs helped form special-purpose acquisition company (SPAC) Forest Road Acquisition Corp as a director, teaming with former Disney colleague Kevin Mayer, and the Forest Road Company (FRC), of which he is an original investor and advisory board member. Other board members and advisors of Forest Road Acquisition Corp include FRC founder Zachary Tarica, Shaquille O'Neal, Mark Burg and Martin Luther King III. FRC is a "full-service provider" to the independent film industry, loaning funds against state film tax credits. FRC began public trading on November 25, 2020 (NYSE:FRX), and was reported that month to have raised more than $US300 million, and to have funded and brokered over 150 film and TV projects through state motion picture tax credits.

In February 2021, an agreement for a three-way merger between Forest Road Acquisition Corp, Myx Fitness Holdings and Beachbody was entered into, which values the new business combination at $US2.9 billion. On February 18, 2021, Forest Road Acquisition Corp II filed for an IPO, with Staggs as co-founder, raising $US350 million, recorded in early March.

Board memberships
Since leaving Disney, Staggs has been an active investor and advisor for various companies. He is also a member of the boards of directors of:
 Spotify
Forest Road Acquisition Corp. II
Curtis L. Carlson School of Management
PureForm Global

References

1961 births
American chief operating officers
American film studio executives
American entertainment industry businesspeople
American media executives
Carlson School of Management alumni
Date of birth missing (living people)
Disney executives
Living people
Place of birth missing (living people)
Stanford Graduate School of Business alumni
Stanford University alumni